Michael J. Bronson, M.D., is an American orthopaedic surgeon, Chairman of the Department of Orthopedic Surgery, Mount Sinai West and Mount Sinai Morningside, and Chief of Joint Replacement Surgery at the Icahn School of Medicine at Mount Sinai in New York, and the author of extensive advances in the development of minimally invasive surgical instruments to advance unicondylar partial knee replacement, including the Vision Total Hip System, a widely used hip replacement system that avoids the use of cement.

From 1977 to 1979, Bronson was the assistant team physician to the New York Yankees, the New York Knicks, the New York Jets and the New York Islanders. He is currently Chief of Joint Replacement Surgery at Mount Sinai Hospital and Associate Professor of Orthopaedic Surgery at the Icahn School of Medicine at Mount Sinai, both in New York City. His practice focuses on total hip and total knee replacement, partial knee replacement, and revision of failed total joint replacements.

Bronson is the author of 17 publications and is listed among New York Magazine's "Best Doctors". Castle Connolly has listed him eight times among New York's "Top Doctors", as well as "Top Doctors in America."  He has received the American Medical Association's Physicians Recognition Award with Commendation 10 times since 1981.

Biography
Bronson was born in 1952. He received his B.A. from New York University in 1973 and his M.D. from New York Medical College in 1976. He completed a residency in general surgery at Lenox Hill Hospital in 1977, and, in 1980, two additional residencies: in orthopedic surgery at Lenox Hill Hospital and in pediatric orthopedics at Children's Hospital Boston in Massachusetts. He completed a fellowship in joint replacement surgery at Columbia-Presbyterian Medical Center as the Senior Annie C. Kane Fellow in Hip and Knee Surgery.

Bronson joined the staff at Lenox Hill Hospital in 1981. In 2005, he joined the staff at Mount Sinai Hospital.

Bronson serves as an editorial reviewer for The Journal of Arthroplasty and Clinical Orthopaedics and Related Research. He is a member of American Medical Association, the American College of Surgeons, the Medical Society of the State of New York, the New York State Society of Orthopedic Surgeons, the New York County Medical Society, the New York Academy of Medicine, Independent Doctors of New York and the American Association of Hip and Knee Surgeons.

Honors and awards
Maurice H. Cowen, M.D. Memorial Award for Excellence in Medical Teaching, Department of Orthopedic Surgery, Lenox Hill Hospital, 1993
“Best Doctors”, New York Magazine
"Top Doctors" – Castle Connolly Medical Ltd., Orthopedic Surgery, 1995, 1997, 1999, 2001, 2003, 2005, 2007, 2009
American Medical Association Physicians’ Recognition Award With Commendation, 1981, 1984, 1987, 1990, 1993, 1996, 1999, 2001, 2004, 2007, 2010
New York Super Doctors, 2009, 2010, 2011, 2012, 2013, 2014
"Top Doctors in America" - Castle Connolly Medical 2009

Publications
Partial list:

References

External links
Mount Sinai Hospital homepage
Icahn School of Medicine at Mount Sinai homepage

1952 births
Living people
Icahn School of Medicine at Mount Sinai faculty
New York Medical College alumni
New York University alumni
American orthopedic surgeons